Textualism is a formalist theory in which the interpretation of the law is primarily based on the ordinary meaning of the legal text, where no consideration is given to non-textual sources, such as intention of the law when passed, the problem it was intended to remedy, or significant questions regarding the justice or rectitude of the law.

Definition

The textualist will "look at the statutory structure and hear the words as they would sound in the mind of a skilled, objectively reasonable user of words." The textualist thus does not give weight to legislative history materials when attempting to ascertain the meaning of a text. Textualism is often erroneously conflated with originalism, and was advocated by United States Supreme Court Justices such as Hugo Black and Antonin Scalia; the latter staked out his claim in his 1997 Tanner Lecture: "[it] is the law that governs, not the intent of the lawgiver." Oliver Wendell Holmes Jr., although not a textualist himself, well-captured this philosophy, and its rejection of intentionalism: "We ask, not what this man meant, but what those words would mean in the mouth of a normal speaker of English, using them in the circumstances in which they were used ... We do not inquire what the legislature meant; we ask only what the statutes mean."

Textualists argue courts should read the words of a statutory text as any ordinary Member of Congress would have read them.  They look for the meaning "that a reasonable person would gather from the text of the law, placed alongside the remainder of the corpus juris [the body of law]." The textualist cares about the statutory purpose to the extent that is suggested from the text.

Strict constructionism is often misused by laypersons and critics as a synonym for textualism. Nevertheless, although a textualist could be a strict constructionist, these are distinctive views. To illustrate this, we may quote Justice Scalia, who warns that "[t]extualism should not be confused with so-called strict constructionism, a degraded form of textualism that brings the whole philosophy into disrepute. I am not a strict constructionist, and no one ought to be... A text should not be construed strictly, and it should not be construed leniently; it should be construed reasonably, to contain all that it fairly means." Similarly, textualism should not be confused with the "plain meaning" approach, a simpler theory used prominently by the Burger Court in cases such as Tennessee Valley Authority v. Hill, which looked to the dictionary definitions of words, without reference to common public understanding or context.

Methods
Textualism looks to the ordinary meaning of the language of the text, but it looks at the ordinary meaning of the text, not merely the possible range of meaning of each of its constituent words (see Noscitur a sociis):

As an illustrative example, Justice Scalia refers to a case in which the law provided for a longer sentence when the defendant "uses a firearm"  "during and in relation to" a "drug trafficking crime." In the case, the defendant had offered to trade an unloaded gun as barter for cocaine, and the majority (wrongly, in his view) took this meeting the standard for the enhanced penalty. He writes that "a proper textualist" would have decided differently: "The phrase 'uses a gun' fairly connoted use of a gun for what guns are normally used for, that is, as a weapon. As I put the point in my dissent, when you ask someone, 'Do you use a cane?' you are not inquiring whether he has hung his grandfather's antique cane as a decoration in the hallway." Justice Scalia has also written:

Textualists do not, generally, accept the authority of the Courts to "refine" statutes:

Textualists acknowledge the interpretive doctrine of lapsus linguae (slip of the tongue), also called "scrivener's error."  This doctrine accounts for the situation when on the very face of the statute, it is apparent that there is a mistake of expression. (See, e.g., United States v. X-Citement Video, 513 U.S. 64) (1994) (Scalia, J., dissenting) ("I have been willing, in the case of civil statutes, to acknowledge a doctrine of 'scrivener's error' that permits a court to give an unusual (though not unheard of) meaning to a word which, if given its normal meaning, would produce an absurd and arguably unconstitutional result") and even break it (see, e.g., Green v. Bock Laundry Machine Co., 490 U.S. 504, 527) (1989) (Scalia, J., concurring) ("We are confronted here with a statute which, if interpreted literally, produces an absurd, and perhaps unconstitutional, result. Our task is to give some alternative meaning to the word "defendant" in Federal Rule of Evidence 609(a)(1) that avoids this consequence; and then to determine whether Rule 609(a)(1) excludes the operation of Federal Rule of Evidence 403.") Other textualists might reach alternative conclusions.  Scalia's apparent inconsistency is perhaps explained by his choice to sometimes adhere to the more venerable judicial canons of interpretation, such as the constitutional avoidance canon.

The word "textualism" was first used by Mark Pattison in 1863 to criticize Puritan theology, according to the Oxford English Dictionary.  Justice Robert Jackson first used the word "textualism" in a Supreme Court opinion a century later in Youngstown Sheet & Tube Co. v. Sawyer.

Australia

Textualism was influential in Australia, and was particularly prominent in the interpretative approach of Sir Garfield Barwick. Amendments to the Acts Interpretation Act 1901 have rejected key elements of textualism, stating that statements made in the Second Reading speech by Ministers introducing an Act may be used in the interpretation of that act.

Textualism v. purposivism 
Purposivism is the perspective of statutory interpretation in which the judges should construe statutes to execute their legislative purpose. Textualism is the perspective of statutory interpretation in which the courts should read the words of that statutory text as any ordinary member of congress would have read them.

See also
 Judicial activism
 Legal positivism
 Letter and spirit of the law
 Originalism
 Traditionalist theology (Islam)

References

Further reading
 Solum, Lawrence, Legal Theory Lexicon: Textualism, Legal Theory Blog.
 
 
 
 
 

T
Theories of constitutional interpretation